Grange Moor is a village in the Kirklees district of West Yorkshire, England. The village is situated between Huddersfield (6 miles (10 km) away) and Wakefield (9 miles (14 km) away). In 2019 it had an estimated population of 1101.

The village is represented on Kirkburton parish council and is in the Kirkburton ward of Kirklees Council.

Grange Moor is situated on moorland with the same name and is to the north of a road junction on the A642, A637 and B6118 roads (known as Grange Moor Crossroads). Shuttle Eye Colliery was situated near the crossroads, its site now occupied by  warehousing.

The church is dedicated to St Bartholomew. The village school, Grange Moor Primary School, has places for 120 children.
The village is policed by the West Yorkshire Police.

Grange Moor Brass Band was formed 1854, and has had a band room in the village since 1937.

During WW2, a V-1 missile fell in the area.

Transport
Arriva Yorkshire and Yorkshire Tiger operate bus services towards Huddersfield (services 231 and 242) and Dewsbury (service 230/A)

References

External links
Community Statistics

Villages in West Yorkshire
Kirkburton